Amaral may refer to:
Amaral (band), a music group from Zaragoza, Spain
Amaral (album), its debut album
Amaral (surname), a Portuguese-language surname
do Amaral, a Portuguese-language surname
Amaral (crater), a crater on Mercury
Azal tinto, also known as Amaral, a wine variety

Football players

Amaral (footballer, born 1954), Brazilian footballer, João Justino Amaral dos Santos
Amaral (footballer, born 1966), Brazilian footballer, Wagner Pereira Cardozo
Amaral (footballer, born 1973), Brazilian footballer, Alexandre da Silva Mariano
Amaral (footballer, born 1978), Brazilian footballer, Anderson Conrado
Amaral (footballer, born 1983), Brazilian footballer, Carlos Rafael do Amaral
Amaral (footballer, born 1986), Brazilian footballer, William José de Souza
Amaral (footballer, born 1987), Brazilian footballer, Antônio Cleilson da Silva Feitosa
Amaral (footballer, born 1988), Brazilian footballer, Mauricio Azevedo Alves

See also